In astrophysics, the Tolman–Oppenheimer–Volkoff (TOV) equation constrains the structure of a spherically symmetric body of isotropic material which is in static gravitational equilibrium, as modelled by general relativity.  The equation is

The quantity , the total mass within , is discussed below.

The equation is derived by solving the Einstein equations for a general time-invariant, spherically symmetric metric.  For a solution to the Tolman–Oppenheimer–Volkoff equation, this metric will take the form

where  is determined by the constraint

When supplemented with an equation of state, which relates density to pressure, the Tolman–Oppenheimer–Volkoff equation completely determines the structure of a spherically symmetric body of isotropic material in equilibrium.  If terms of order  are neglected, the Tolman–Oppenheimer–Volkoff equation becomes the Newtonian hydrostatic equation, used to find the equilibrium structure of a spherically symmetric body of isotropic material when general-relativistic corrections are not important.

If the equation is used to model a bounded sphere of material in a vacuum, the zero-pressure condition  and the condition  should be imposed at the boundary. The second boundary condition is imposed so that the metric at the boundary is continuous with the unique static spherically symmetric solution to the vacuum field equations, the Schwarzschild metric:

Total mass
 is the total mass contained inside radius , as measured by the gravitational field felt by a distant observer. It satisfies .

Here,  is the total mass of the object, again, as measured by the gravitational field felt by a distant observer.

Computing the mass by integrating the density of the object over its volume, on the other hand, will yield the larger value

The difference between these two quantities,

Derivation from general relativity

Let us assume a static, spherically symmetric perfect fluid. The metric components are similar to those for the Schwarzschild metric:

By the perfect fluid assumption, the stress-energy tensor is diagonal (in the central spherical coordinate system), with eigenvalues of energy density and pressure:

and

To proceed further, we solve Einstein's field equations:

Let us first consider the  component:

where  is as defined in the previous section. Next, consider the  component. Explicitly, we have

which we can simplify (using our expression for ) to

We obtain a second equation by demanding continuity of the stress-energy tensor: . Observing that  (since the configuration is assumed to be static) and that  (since the configuration is also isotropic), we obtain in particular

Rearranging terms yields: 

This gives us two expressions, both containing . Eliminating , we obtain:

{|cellpadding="2" style="border:2px solid #ccccff"
|
|}

History
Richard C. Tolman analyzed spherically symmetric metrics in 1934 and 1939.  The form of the equation given here was derived by J. Robert Oppenheimer and George Volkoff in their 1939 paper, "On Massive Neutron Cores".  In this paper, the equation of state for a degenerate Fermi gas of neutrons was used to calculate an upper limit of ~0.7 solar masses for the gravitational mass of a neutron star.  Since this equation of state is not realistic for a neutron star, this limiting mass is likewise incorrect. Using gravitational wave observations from binary neutron star mergers (like GW170817) and the subsequent information from electromagnetic radiation (kilonova), the data suggest that the maximum mass limit is close to 2.17 solar masses. Earlier estimates for this limit range from 1.5 to 3.0 solar masses.

Post-Newtonian approximation
In other words, we have

See also
 Hydrostatic equation
 Tolman–Oppenheimer–Volkoff limit
 Solutions of the Einstein field equations
 Static spherically symmetric perfect fluid

References

Astrophysics
Exact solutions in general relativity